Cnesteboda anisocornutana is a species of moth of the family Tortricidae. It is found in India (Assam) and Burma.

References

Moths described in 1964
Tortricini